The 2015 All-Ireland Senior Ladies' Football Championship is the 42nd edition of the Ladies' Gaelic Football Association's premier inter-county Ladies' Gaelic football tournament since its establishment in 1974. It is known for sponsorship reasons as the TG4 All-Ireland Senior Ladies' Football Championship. It commenced on 14 June 2015.

Provincial championships

Connacht Championship

Leinster Championship

Munster Championship

Ulster Championship

All-Ireland Qualifiers
The ten teams beaten in the provincial championships contest the qualifiers. Two matches are played in a preliminary round to eliminate two teams. The eight remaining teams play four matches and the four winners play the four provincial champions in the All-Ireland quarter-finals.

All-Ireland

All-Ireland Quarter-Finals
The four provincial champions play the four winners from the qualifiers.

All-Ireland Semi-Finals

All-Ireland final

References